Global Mall Banqiao Station is a shopping mall in Banqiao District, New Taipei, Taiwan that opened in April 2010. It is the second store of Global Mall.

Gallery

See also
 List of tourist attractions in Taiwan
 Global Mall Taoyuan A8
 Global Mall Xinzuoying Station
 Global Mall Pingtung
 Global Mall Zhonghe

References

External links

2010 establishments in Taiwan
Shopping malls in New Taipei
Shopping malls established in 2010
Banqiao District